Pospelikhinsky is a rural locality (a settlement) in Pospelikhinsky District of Altai Krai, Russia.

References

Notes

Sources

Rural localities in Pospelikhinsky District